Lin Yu-ting (born 13 December 1995) is a Taiwanese boxer. She is from New Taipei City.

She won a gold medal at the 2018 AIBA Women's World Boxing Championships as a bantamweight, followed by a medal at the 2019 AIBA Women's World Boxing Championships.

References

1995 births
Living people
Taiwanese women boxers
AIBA Women's World Boxing Championships medalists
Featherweight boxers
Asian Games bronze medalists for Chinese Taipei
Boxers at the 2014 Asian Games
Boxers at the 2018 Asian Games
Asian Games medalists in boxing
Medalists at the 2018 Asian Games
Sportspeople from New Taipei
Olympic boxers of Taiwan
Boxers at the 2020 Summer Olympics
21st-century Taiwanese women